Dom Um Romão (3 August 1925 – 27 July 2005) was a Brazilian jazz drummer and percussionist. Noted for his expressive stylings with the fusion band Weather Report, Romão also recorded with varied notable artists such as Cannonball Adderley, Paul Simon, Antonio Carlos Jobim, Jorge Ben, Sergio Mendes and Brasil '66, and Tony Bennett. He was the percussionist Tom Jobim brought to the studio for the album Jobim recorded with Frank Sinatra in 1967 for Reprise Records, Francis Albert Sinatra & Antônio Carlos Jobim.

He died in Rio de Janeiro shortly after suffering a stroke.

Discography

As leader 

 1965 Dom Um (Phillips)
 1972 Dom Um Romão (Muse)
 1973 Spirit of the Times (Muse)
 1974 Braun-Blek-Blu (Happy Bird) 
 1977 Hotmosphere (Pablo)
 1978 Om (JAPO Records/ECM Records)
 1990 Samba de Rua (Vogue Records)
 1993 Saudades (Waterlilly)
 1999 Rhythm Traveller (JSR/Natasha)
 2001 Lake of Perseverance (JSR/Irma)
 2002 Nu Jazz meets Brazil (JSR/Cuadra)

As sideman 

With Cannonball Adderley
 Cannonball's Bossa Nova (Riverside, 1962)
With Ron Carter
 Yellow & Green (CTI, 1976)
With Frank Sinatra
 Francis Albert Sinatra & Antônio Carlos Jobim (Reprise FS 1021, 1967)
With Astrud Gilberto
 Look to the Rainbow (Verve, 1966)
 Gilberto with Turrentine with Stanley Turrentine (CTI, 1971)'
With Yusef Lateef
 The Doctor is In... and Out (Atlantic, 1976)
With Herbie Mann
 Do the Bossa Nova with Herbie Mann (Atlantic, 1962)
 Latin Fever (Atlantic, 1964)
 Brazil: Once Again (Atlantic, 1977)
With Collin Walcott
 Grazing Dreams (ECM, 1977)
With Weather Report
 I Sing the Body Electric (Columbia, 1972)
 Live in Tokyo (Columbia, 1972) 
 Sweetnighter (Columbia, 1973)
 Mysterious Traveller (Columbia, 1974)
With Robert Palmer
 Heavy Nova (EMI, 1988)
With Annette Peacock
 I'm the One (RCA Victor, 1972)
With Peter Giger and Family of Percussion
 Mozambique meets Europe (B&W music, 1992)
With Blood, Sweat & Tears
 Mirror Image (Columbia, 1974)

References

External links 
 Discography

1925 births
2005 deaths
Brazilian composers
Brazilian drummers
Brazilian jazz musicians
Brazilian percussionists
Brazilian record producers
Brazilian rock musicians
Muse Records artists
Música Popular Brasileira musicians
Weather Report members
Musicians from Rio de Janeiro (city)
20th-century Brazilian musicians
21st-century Brazilian musicians
20th-century composers
21st-century composers
20th-century drummers
21st-century drummers
Sergio Mendes and Brasil '66 members